G.H. Alex Collins (August 28, 1876 – May 1949) was a photographer, soldier, and political figure in Ontario, Canada. George Hamilton Alexander Collins. He was mayor of Eastview in 1921 and from 1928 to 1930.

Collins was born in Ottawa, the son of Peter Collins and Sarah Henry, and was educated there. He entered the Canadian Army before the end of the 19th century, becoming sergeant-major in 1913. He was a member of the Royal Canadian Dragoons and the 4th Canadian Mounted Rifles and served in the Second Boer War and World War I. Collins married Jennie Gordon. He was elected to the first municipal council for Eastview in 1913. Collins ran unsuccessfully for the position of mayor in 1915. He served as acting mayor in 1921 following the death of Camille Gladu but was unsuccessful when he ran for that post in the election held the following year. He was first elected mayor in an election held in December 1927. Collins was reelected in 1928 and 1929, then was defeated by David Langelier when he ran for reelection in December 1930. Collins died on May 14 or 15 in 1949.

References 
 

1876 births
1949 deaths
Mayors of Eastview and Vanier
Canadian military personnel of the Second Boer War
Canadian military personnel of World War I
Royal Canadian Dragoons soldiers